Dumraon Raj was a medieval chieftaincy and later a zamindari estate in erstwhile Shahabad district of Bihar (now in Buxar district). The total area under this zamindari was 4,85,000 acres which is equivalent to 1963 Square Kilometer. 

They were also the main patrons of the Brahampur mela.

Origins

The founders of Dumraon Raj were Ujjainiya Rajputs who traced their origin to the Parmar rulers of Malwa who moved to Western Bihar in the 13th century. The various branches of the Ujjainiyas founded various estates in Bihar including Jagdispur, Shakarpura and Dumraon.

One of the major chieftains of Bhojpur, Raja Narayan Mal, received a land grant from the Mughal emperor Jahangir and was conferred the title of Raja in 1604 A.D. His descendant, Raja Horil Singh, moved the capital of Narayan Mals estate to Dumraon which was also called "Horilnagar".

Rulers
The historical papers of the Dumraon Raj are contained within a document called the Tawarikh-i-Ujjainiya which details the history of the chieftaincy as well as some of the earlier rulers including:

1st Raja — Narayan Mal (1604-1622)
2nd Raja — Prabhal Singh (1622-1672)
3rd Raja — Sujan Singh (1672-1708)
4th Raja — Horil Shah (1708-1746)
5th Raja — Chhatardhari Singh (1746-1770) 
6th Raja — Vikramaditya Singh (1770-1805)
7th Raja — Jai Prakash Singh (1805-1838)
8th Raja — Janki Prasad Singh (1838-1844)
9th Raja — Maheshwar Baksh Singh (1844-1881)
10th Raja — Radha Prasad Singh (1881-1894)
Maharani Beni Prasad Kuari (1894-1907)
11th Raja — Srinivas Prasad Singh (1907-1911)
12th Raja — Keshav Prasad Singh (1911-1933)
13th Raja — Ram Ran Vijay Prasad Singh (1933-1947)

See also
Ujjainiya
Zamindars of Bihar

References

States and territories established in 1604
States and territories disestablished in 1952
Kingdoms of Bihar
History of Bihar
Rajput estates
Zamindari estates